Afanasovo is a rural locality (a village) in Novlenskoye Rural Settlement, Vologodsky District, Vologda Oblast, Russia. The population was 29 as of 2002.

Geography 
Afanasovo is located 78 km northwest of Vologda (the district's administrative centre) by road. Khomyakovo is the nearest rural locality.

References 

Rural localities in Vologodsky District